Guy Stéphane Essame (born 25 November 1984) is a Cameroonian former footballer.

Career

Club
In 2008, he signed for the Chechen club Terek Grozny, before he played in Boavista where he has played since 2005, playing 22 matches but has yet to score a goal. On 27 July 2009 FC Nizhny Novgorod have signed the Cameroonian midfielder on loan from Terek Grozny.

Atyrau
In December 2013, Essame signed for Kazakhstan Premier League side FC Atyrau. On the last day of the 2014 Kazakhstan Premier League transfer window, 9 July 2014, Essame moved on loan to FC Astana, with Marat Shakhmetov going the opposite way, till the end of the season.

At the end of the 2016 season, Essame signed a new one-year contract with Atyrau. However the contract never reached the Kazakhstan Premier League, with the Director of Atyrau cancelling the contract in January 2017, after Essame had taken part in the club's first pre-season training camp.

International
After a long spell in the Brasseries football academy, also responsible for forming the likes of Rigobert Song and Geremi Njitap, he captained the U17 Cameroon's national team to two continental competitions. A brief stop in Paraguay was then followed by a departure for Portugal, in Boavista. He made his first cap for Cameroon national football team in the 2010 WCQ match against Mauritius on 11 October 2008.

Career statistics

Club

International

Statistics accurate as of match played 11 February 2009

Honours 
Astana
 Kazakhstan Premier League (1): 2014

Other activities 
In 2009, Guy Stephane Essame founded FC Lotus-Terek Yaoundé in Cameroon coached by Thomas Libiih. In September 2010, it became a farm team of FC Terek Grozny.

References

1984 births
Living people
Footballers from Douala
Cameroonian footballers
Cameroonian expatriate footballers
Cameroon international footballers
Paraguayan Primera División players
Primeira Liga players
Russian Premier League players
Kazakhstan Premier League players
Belarusian Premier League players
FC Nizhny Novgorod (2007) players
FC Neman Grodno players
FC Atyrau players
FC Astana players
Sportivo Luqueño players
Boavista F.C. players
FC Akhmat Grozny players
Expatriate footballers in Russia
Expatriate footballers in Paraguay
Expatriate footballers in Portugal
Expatriate footballers in Belarus
Expatriate footballers in Kazakhstan
Association football midfielders